15 Pashons - Coptic calendar - 17 Pashons

Fixed commemorations
All fixed commemorations below are observed on 16 Pashons (24 May) by the Coptic Orthodox Church.

Events
Commemoration of the Evangelism of Saint John the Evangelist, and the consecration of his church in Alexandria

References
Coptic Synexarion

Days of the Coptic calendar